A Stranger Came to the Farm is a 1937 novel by the Finnish writer Mika Waltari. It tells the tragic story of a farming couple where the husband is an alcohol abuser.

Publication
The book was published in Finnish by WSOY in 1937. It appeared in English in 1952, translated by Naomi Walford and published by Putnam.

Reception
Edmund Fuller of Saturday Review wrote that the book
is effective, striking, in many ways. Yet in spite of the sparseness and compactness of the book [Waltari] manages to make it almost lush, or purple, in some of its passages. It is good of its kind, but I am afraid it is more of an interesting item in relation to Waltari's body of work than an enhancement of his reputation.

Adaptations
The book has been adapted for film twice, in 1938 by Wilho Ilmari as Vieras mies tuli taloon and in 1957 by Hannu Leminen as The Stranger.

References

1937 Finnish novels
20th-century Finnish novels
Finnish-language novels
Finnish novels adapted into films
Novels by Mika Waltari